Capricorn Cougars were an Australian football club from Rockhampton, Queensland who played in the Queensland State League.

History
The Capricorn Cougars were one of ten foundation teams in the QSL formed in 2008.

In 2008 the Capricorn Cougars coach was Justin Kilshaw. He resigned after round 4 after conflict occurred between the coaches objectives and outcomes for the team, in comparison to the Boards requirements on player selections for the team.

The current coach is Bradley Smith, who is a locally grown coach with great knowledge of the region. He had previously been Assistant Coach to Kilshaw in 2008 and was quickly appointed Head Coach after Kilshaw's resignation.

In 2008 Cougars player Michael Cay was selected in Soccer International's top 50 players in Australia outside the A-League.

Another player who has been successful at the Cougars is Tristan Fraser who was hand picked by Ian Ferguson, the coach of the new A-League team North Queensland Fury to attend a training session in Townsville prior to the 2009–2010 season.

Capricorn Cougars aim to provide the highest level of football possible for local talent throughout their district. However, due to the geographical distance between the major towns in Central Queensland; Rockhampton, Gladstone, Yeppoon, Emerald and Biloela the Cougars struggle to represent the zone as a whole with the majority of the squad being based in Rockhampton. The Capricorn Cougars coach Brad Smith has been quoted saying, "We are not going to beg players to play" hinting that those who want to play at the highest level available still have the opportunity but they must want to play and train and go through the trial process. The Capricorn Cougars have been criticised in the past for not offering to take in the best players from Gladstone and favouring Rockhampton based players in the past. In 2011 the Cougars signed two talented UK-based players. After completing successful trials, both Liam Williams and Tom Evans were added to the squad for that season.

Current squad
2012 Queensland State League Squad

References

Queensland State League soccer teams
Association football clubs established in 2008
2008 establishments in Australia